The men's single skating competition of the 1960 Winter Olympics was held at the Blyth Arena in Squaw Valley, California, United States. The compulsory figures section took place on Wednesday 24 February 1960 with the free skating section concluding the event two days later. Each judge ranked each skater by Ordinal Placement from first to last place. If a skater was ranked first by a majority of the judges, that skater was placed first overall, this process was repeated for each place. If more than one skater had a majority ranking for the same position then a series of tiebreaks were in place, indicated in order in the result section.

David Jenkins won gold for the United States succeeding his older brother Hayes Alan Jenkins. Karol Divín of Czecholslovakia took silver after leading after the compulsory section.

Results

Referee:
  Rudolf Marx

Assistant Referee:
  Harold G. Storke

Judges:
  Franz Wojtanowskyj
  John Greig
  Emil Skákala
  Gérard Rodrigues Henriques
  Theo Klemm
  Geoffrey S. Yates
  Shotaro Kobayashi
  Emile Finsterwald
  Deane McMinn

References

External links
 1960 Squaw Valley Official Olympic Report
 sports-reference

Figure skating at the 1960 Winter Olympics
Men's events at the 1960 Winter Olympics